Sarikei may refer to:
Sarikei
Sarikei District
Sarikei Division
Sarikei (federal constituency), represented in the Dewan Rakyat